Majdabad or Majd Abad, also rendered as Mujdabad, may refer to various places in Iran:
 Majdabad, Marvdasht, Fars Province
 Majdabad, Isfahan
 Majdabad-e Kohneh, Markazi Province
 Majdabad-e Now, Markazi Province
 Majdabad, Razavi Khorasan
 Majdabad Rural District, in Fars Province

See also
 Majidabad (disambiguation)